Boari is an Italian surname. Notable people with the surname include:

Adamo Boari (1863–1928), Italian civil engineer and architect
Lucilla Boari (born 1997), Italian archer

Italian-language surnames